Forever with You is the tenth and final studio album by American soul singer-songwriter Phyllis Hyman. It was released by Volcano Records on July 28, 1998. The album was released three years after Hyman's death and contains twelve previously unreleased songs that were recorded between 1985 and 1995 during her time on the Philadelphia International Records label. The album charted on the Billboard Top R&B Albums chart at No. 66 in 1998.

Track listing

References

External links
 

1998 albums
Phyllis Hyman albums
Albums produced by Kenneth Gamble
Albums produced by Leon Huff
Albums published posthumously
Volcano Entertainment albums
Philadelphia International Records albums